"Destruction" is the ninth episode aired of the first series of UFO - a 1970 British television science fiction series about an alien invasion of Earth. The screenplay was written by  Dennis Spooner and the director was Ken Turner. The episode was filmed between 4 June and 16 June 1970 and aired on the ATV Midlands on 2 December 1970. Though shown as the ninth episode, it was actually the twentieth to have been filmed.

The series was created by Gerry Anderson and Sylvia Anderson with Reg Hill, and produced by the Andersons and Lew Grade's Century 21 Productions for Grade's ITC Entertainment company.

Story
A Royal Navy destroyer in the Atlantic Ocean shoots down a UFO. Straker wants to know why the UFO was interested in the ship and how it managed to evade SHADO's detection. The UFO's wreckage is too deep for Skydiver One to retrieve and a Royal Navy admiral, Sheringham, refuses to divulge any information on the incident or the ship's mission.

Straker decides to see if he can get information out of the Admiral's secretary, astrophile Sarah Bonsanquet (the daughter of one of the astronauts who disappeared while building the SHADO Moonbase). He has Foster establish a relationship with Sarah and, while they're on a date with Sarah, Straker and Colonel Virginia Lake break into and search her apartment. There they discover a refracting telescope with a transmitter powerful enough to reach the aliens - she has been passing information to them.

Straker learns that the ship was going to dump nerve gas into the sea but the aliens see an opportunity to release it into the atmosphere to kill the Earth's human population. Three UFOs are then detected heading for the ship, proving that the aliens have managed to circumvent SHADO's detection systems. Moon-based SHADO Interceptors destroy one UFO but another attacks the ship, which is later saved when Skydiver One arrives and Sky One destroys the UFO.

Cast

Starring
 Ed Bishop — Commander Edward Straker
 Michael Billington — Col. Paul Foster
 Wanda Ventham — Col. Virginia Lake
 Dolores Mantez — Lt. Nina Barry
 Ayshea — Lt. Ayshea Johnson

Also Starring
 Grant Taylor — Gen. James L. Henderson
 Stephanie Beacham — Sarah Bosanquet

Featuring
 Edwin Richfield — Admiral Sheringham	
 Philip Madoc — Captain Steven	
 Peter Blythe — Second Officer Cooper	
 Steven Berkoff — Captain Steve Minto	
 David Warbeck — Sky Diver Captain	
 Barry Stokes — Sky Diver engineer	
 Jimmy Winston — Rating	
 Michael Ferrand — Radar technician	
 Robert Lloyd — Radar officer

Production notes
 Locations included Neptune House, ATV Elstree Studios, Borehamwood; Burnham Beeches, Buckinghamshire; and Horseguards Parade, Admiralty House and Trafalgar Square in London.
 Archive Footage, provided by the Ministry of Defence, featured HMS Hampshire (D06), a County Class Guided Missile Destroyer and the Seaslug Missile System 
 Philip Madoc is one of the eleven actors to appear in both Doppelgänger and the UFO series. This was also his second episode, having previously appeared as Straker's ex-wife's new husband in A Question of Priorities.

References

External links

1970 British television episodes
UFO (TV series) episodes